The Doom Patrol is a team of comic book superheroes, as published by DC Comics. The roster of the team has changed a great deal over the years. These roster lists are of the members during the Patrol's various incarnations by team iteration.

The codenames listed under Character are those used during the time frame of the particular iteration. Characters with more than one codename for that period have them listed chronologically and separated by a slash (/). Bolded names in the most recent iteration published are the current team members. First appearance is the place where the character first appeared as a member of a particular iteration. It is not necessarily the first appearance of the character in print, nor the story depicting how the character joined the team.

All information is listed in publication order first, then alphabetical.

Original roster
This roster covers the iteration of the team that appeared during the 1960s under the tenure of writers Arnold Drake and Bob Haney.

Second roster
This roster covers the iteration of the team that appeared from the late 1970s through the mid-1990s. After sporadic appearances in various titles from 1977 to 1987, the team was given its own title, Doom Patrol vol. 2, from October 1987 (#1) until February 1995 (#87). The revised series progressed through writers Paul Kupperberg, Grant Morrison, and finally Rachel Pollack.

Third roster
This roster covers the iteration of the team that appeared from 2001 through 2003 under the tenure of John Arcudi.

Fourth roster
This roster covers the iteration of the team that first appeared in 2004. Under the tenure of John Byrne, this iteration was retconned to be the first in continuity appearance of the team. A later story arc brought all previous appearances back into continuity.

Fifth roster
This roster returns the team to its original lineup.

Sixth roster
In September 2011, The New 52 rebooted DC's continuity. This roster is the first roster of the team in that continuity.

Seventh roster
This roster is featured in the Young Animal imprint.

DC Universe streaming service (2018-present)
This roster was featured in the video on demand streaming service, DC Universe, which was transferred to HBO Max after the consolidation of WarnerMedia.  Appearing in the show Titans and its spin-off Doom Patrol.

References

Doom Patrol
Doom Patrol members